Enzo Ghigo (born 24 February 1953) is an Italian politician, former President of Piedmont from 1995 to 2005.

Biography 
A manager of the Publitalia-Fininvest group, whose owner was Silvio Berlusconi, Ghigo entered politics in December 1993, becoming the promoter of Forza Italia in Piedmont. Elected to the Chamber of Deputies in 1994, Ghigo was elected President of Piedmont in 1995, leading a center-right coalition.

In 2000, Ghigo was re-elected Governor, defeating The Olive Tree candidate Livia Turco, and remained at the head of his region until 2005, when, seeking a third term, he was defeated by The Union candidate Mercedes Bresso.

In 2006, Ghigo refused the offer to run for Mayor of Turin, and was instead elected Senator for Forza Italia in Piedmont and held his seat until 2013.

Honours and awards 
 : Grand Cross Knight of the Order of Merit of the Italian Republic (28 May 2002)
 : Grand Officer of the Order of Merit of the Italian Republic (27 December 1996)

References

External links 
Files about his parliamentary activities (in Italian): XII, XV, XVI legislature

1953 births
Living people
Politicians from Turin
Members of the Regional Council of Piedmont
Presidents of Piedmont
Deputies of Legislature XII of Italy
Senators of Legislature XV of Italy
Senators of Legislature XVI of Italy
Forza Italia politicians
The People of Freedom politicians
20th-century Italian politicians
21st-century Italian politicians
Knights Grand Cross of the Order of Merit of the Italian Republic
Grand Officers of the Order of Merit of the Italian Republic